Trichophassus is a monotypic moth genus of the family Hepialidae. The only described species is Trichophassus giganteus which is endemic to Brazil. The larva of this species has been recorded feeding on Adenocalymma, Eucalyptus, Ipomoea and Solanum.

References

External links
Hepialidae genera

Hepialidae
Monotypic moth genera
Taxa named by Ferdinand Le Cerf
Exoporia genera
Moths of South America